Barañain (in Basque and officially; Spanish Barañáin) is a town and municipality located in the province and autonomous community of Navarre, northern Spain.

It is located in the outskirts of Pamplona, in the Pamplona Basin and 5 km west of the capital of the community, Pamplona, forming part of its metropolitan area. In 2017 it had a population of 20,124 inhabitants (INE), making it the third largest municipality in terms of population in the community, behind Pamplona and Tudela.

Geography 
Barañáin is located on a plateau surrounded by the rivers Arga and Elorz, whose erosive action has created ravines whose slopes are progressively softened towards the west, where both currents have their confluence. To the east, this plateau communicates with that of Pamplona, of which it can be considered the western end. The Arga defines most of the northern boundary of the municipality, while the river Elorz, which flows to the south, serves as a boundary in the last five hundred metres before its mouth.

Administration 
Until 1987, Barañáin was part of the Cendea de Cizur. That year it was constituted as its own local entity. Historically, Barañáin has been a predominantly socialist town, since from 1979 to 1995 it has been governed by the PSN-PSOE without interruption and with the same candidate.

In the General Elections, the PSOE is always the most voted list with a great distance between the other parties.

Municipal Elections 2015 
In the 2015 municipal elections, the Union of the People of Navarre (UPN) obtained 26.36% of the votes and 6 councillors, followed by Geroa Bai, which obtained 12.12%, the Socialist Party of Navarre (PSOE), which obtained 11.36%, and EH Bildu, which obtained 18.47%, all of which obtained 4 councillors. The Left - Ezkerra also obtained 10.11% and 2 councillors, and the People's Party (PP) obtained 3.24% and no councillors.

Demography 
Barañáin is the third most populated municipality in Navarre, behind the capital of Navarre and Tudela, with a population of 20,124 inhabitants in 2017.9 of which 10,573 are men and 10,979 are women. Its population density is 

From the analysis of the 2009 population pyramid, the following can be deduced:

 The population under 20 years of age is 21.59% of the total.
 The population between 20-40 years old is 32.66%.
 The one between 40-60 years old is 31.21%.
 The one over 60 years old is 14.54%.

This structure of the population is typical of the modern demographic regime, with an evolution towards an aging population and a decrease in the annual birth rate.

References

External links
 City Council of Barañain 
 BARAÑAIN in the Bernardo Estornés Lasa - Auñamendi Encyclopedia (Euskomedia Fundazioa) 

Municipalities in Navarre